The Basilica of St. Mary and St. Bartholomew is a Roman Catholic church in Piekary Śląskie, Poland. There was a church in Piekary Śląskie from the fourteenth century. The current church, designed by Daniel Grötschel in Neo-Romanesqe style, was completed in 1849. On 1 December 1962, Pope John XXIII elevated the church to the status of minor basilica.

References

External links

Piekary Śląskie
Basilica churches in Poland
Churches in Silesian Voivodeship
Buildings and structures in Silesian Voivodeship